The 1975 Formula One season was the 29th season of FIA Formula One motor racing. It featured the 1975 World Championship of F1 Drivers and the 1975 International Cup for F1 Manufacturers which were contested concurrently from 12 January to 5 October over fourteen races. The season also included three non-championship Formula One races and a nine race South African Formula One Championship.

After a strong finish to the 1974 season, many observers felt the Brabham team were favourites to win the 1975 title. The year started well, with an emotional first win for Carlos Pace at the Interlagos circuit in his native São Paulo. However, over the season tyre wear frequently slowed the cars, and the initial promise was not maintained.

Niki Lauda often referred to 1975 as "the unbelievable year". In his second year with Ferrari, the team provided him with the Ferrari 312T – a car that was technically far superior to any of the competition. He won his first world title with five wins and a huge margin over second place in the championship.

American Mark Donohue died in August, two days after a practice run crash for the Austrian Grand Prix. After the season in late November, an Embassy Hill airplane crashed in England and all six aboard were killed, including team owner Graham Hill and driver Tony Brise.

Drivers and constructors
The following drivers and constructors and contested the 1975 World Championship of F1 Drivers and the 1975 International Cup for F1 Manufacturers.

Calendar

Calendar changes
The Spanish Grand Prix was moved from Jarama to Montjuïc, in keeping with the event-sharing arrangement between the two circuits.

The Belgian Grand Prix and Monaco Grand Prix swapped places on the calendar so that the Monaco round followed the Belgian Grand Prix.

The French Grand Prix was moved from Dijon-Prenois to Paul Ricard Circuit.

The British Grand Prix was moved from Brands Hatch to Silverstone, in keeping with the event-sharing arrangement between the two circuits.

The Canadian Grand Prix was originally schedule to be the penultimate race in 1975 but was cancelled due to a small row between Formula One Constructors' Association and Mosport about payments.

Season Review

Race 1: Argentina
The drivers went to Argentina to start the season, and it was Jean-Pierre Jarier in the Shadow who took pole position with the Brabhams of Carlos Pace and Carlos Reutemann second and third on the grid. However, poleman Jarier could not even start the race because his transmission failed on the parade lap. Home hero Reutemann took the lead from teammate Pace, with Niki Lauda's Ferrari third.

Pace passed teammate Reutemann to take the lead but then spun off and dropped to seventh. James Hunt in his Hesketh soon overtook Lauda and then Reutemann, much to the chagrin of the crowd. By then, reigning world champion Emerson Fittipaldi in his McLaren was past Lauda and up to third, and soon took Reutemann for second as well. Fittipaldi closed in on Hunt and took the lead with 18 laps left. Pace recovered to fourth after his spin, but it was to no avail as his engine blew up. Fittipaldi started his title defence with a win, Hunt was a superb second, and Reutemann third in front of his home crowd.

Race 2: Brazil
The second round was in Brazil, and Jarier took pole position again with Fittipaldi alongside and Reutemann third. Reutemann, just like in Argentina, took the lead at the start from Jarier and Pace was up to third, whereas home driver Fittipaldi dropped to seventh. Jarier retook the lead from Reutemann on lap 5 and then pulled away. Reutemann struggled with handling issues and dropped well down the order then, with Pace up to second, Clay Regazzoni's Ferrari third and Fittipaldi recovering to fourth. Jarier's engine stopped with seven laps left and Pace took the lead. Regazzoni was up to second but dropped behind Fittipaldi and Jochen Mass in the second McLaren as he too suffered handling issues. Pace took a home victory, with countryman Fittipaldi second and Mass third.

Race 3: South Africa
A month after the Brazilian race, the field went to South Africa and Pace followed up his win with pole, with Reutemann alongside as Brabham locked out the front row, and home hero Jody Scheckter was third in the Tyrrell. Pace led at the start, with Scheckter second, and Ronnie Peterson in his Lotus jumped up from eighth to take third. However, the Swede did not have the pace of the front runners and dropped back down the order. Scheckter took the lead from Pace on the third lap, to the delight to the fans. Pace kept second until he struggled with tyres and was passed by Reutemann and the second Tyrrell of Patrick Depailler. Scheckter took an emotional home victory, with Reutemann and Depailler completing the podium.

Race 4: Spain
Nearly two months after the third round, the European season began in Spain at the very fast Montjuic street circuit in Barcelona. The Grand Prix Drivers Association was not happy with the state of the barriers, which were not bolted properly, and the drivers threatened not to take part. Mechanics from the teams went around the entire circuit to attempt to repair/fasten down the barriers. After work was done on the circuit, the drivers agreed that the circuit was still not safe enough. Reigning world champion and championship leader Emerson Fittipaldi had no intention to race because of the condition of the barriers, and went home on Sunday morning. The organisers of the event then locked the cars and motorhomes inside the circuit confines for breach of contract and threatened to keep them there. This being incompatible with the schedule for the next race at Monaco, the teams decided to cater for the organisers wishes and raced anyway.

The rest of the drivers were there for qualifying, and Ferrari took the front row, with Lauda on pole from Regazzoni, and Hunt third in the Hesketh. There was chaos at the start when Mario Andretti in his Parnelli tapped the car of polesitter Lauda, sending it into the sister car of Regazzoni and knocking both Ferraris out of contention. Hunt gratefully took the lead, and Andretti, whose car was undamaged was second. Hunt led until he crashed after spinning on oil on the track, leaving Andretti leading from John Watson in the Surtees and Rolf Stommelen's Hill. Watson then had to pit with a vibration and the leader Andretti retired after a suspension failure sent him into the guardrail. This promoted  Pace to second and Peterson to third, but the Swede retired after colliding with backmarker François Migault while lapping him.

On lap 26, Stommelen's rear wing broke, and the car bounced into the barriers and flew back onto the road, hitting the barrier on the other side but the momentum of the car was enough for it to fly over the barrier where spectators were watching. The car hit some of them, and five spectators were killed, and Stommelen and other spectators were injured. Pace also crashed while trying to avoid the Hill as it bounced back off the road. The race went on for the moment, with Jochen Mass passing Jacky Ickx's Lotus to lead. The organizers stopped the race on lap 30 due to the debris on the track caused by Stommelen's crash. Mass was declared the winner, with Ickx second and Reutemann third. Only half points were awarded as the race was stopped before it had run 75% of its full course.

Race 5: Monaco
After the chaotic and tragic Spanish GP, the race on the streets of Monaco was next. Lauda took pole ahead of the Shadow of Tom Pryce, with Pryce's teammate Jarier third. Rain before the race meant that it was started on a damp track. Lauda took off into the lead and Jarier climbed up to second but crashed on the first lap. Peterson was up to second, and Pryce was third. Pryce spun off after 20 laps, giving third to Scheckter. The field soon pitted for dry weather tyres and this shuffled up the order, with Scheckter dropping back after pitting too late. Fittipaldi was up to second behind Lauda, and Pace jumped up to third. That is how it stayed, with Lauda winning, Fittipaldi second and Pace third.

It was the last weekend for Graham Hill in Formula One.

Race 6: Belgium
The next race took place in Belgium, and Lauda was on pole with Pace with him on the front row, and Vittorio Brambilla in the March a surprising third. It was Pace who got the better of Lauda at the start, to lead into the first corner. Pace was leading from Lauda and Brambilla at the end of the first lap, but Brambilla was on the move, and shocked everyone by overtaking both the front-row starters to lead. But this spurred Lauda into action, and after almost immediately passing Pace, he took the lead from Brambilla on the sixth lap. Scheckter was also on the move and was up to second, after passing Brambilla on lap 9. Brambilla held third until he was forced to pit with  tyre troubles. Lauda won, becoming the first driver to take two wins this season, with Scheckter second and Reutemann third.

Race 7: Sweden
In Sweden, it was Brambilla who took his first career pole, with Depailler second and Jarier third on the grid. The order was unchanged at the start, with Brambilla leading but Reutemann was up to third after three laps. Brambilla continued to lead, whereas second-placed Depailler dropped out of contention with brake problems. Reutemann was up to second, and now took the lead from Brambilla. Brambilla had to pit for new tyres almost immediately. Jarier ran second now, but his engine blew up and this gave the position to Pace until he spun off and retired. Lauda was now second, and towards the end of the race Reutemann began to suffer from oversteer, allowing Lauda to take the lead with 10 laps left. Lauda went on to win, with Reutemann and Regazzoni completing the podium.

Race 8: Netherlands
The first race in the second half of the season took place in the Netherlands, and pole went to Lauda as usual, with teammate Regazzoni alongside, and Hunt's Hesketh third. The race started on a damp track and Lauda took the lead, with Scheckter up to second ahead of Regazzoni. The order was unchanged until the drivers had to pit for dry tyres. Hunt and Jarier pitted early, and their gamble paid off as they were first and second, with Lauda, Scheckter and Regazzoni third, fourth and fifth respectively. Lauda passed Jarier for second midway through the race, and started closing on Hunt. Jarier almost immediately retired with a tyre failure, and Scheckter who inherited third had his engine blow up with just 12 laps left. Hunt held off Lauda to take his first career win, with Regazzoni completing the podium.

Race 9: France
France was host to the 9th round of the season, and it was Lauda on pole ahead of Scheckter and Hunt. The top three maintained their starting positions into the first corner. In the early laps, Regazzoni was on a charge, and got up to second on the sixth lap but his engine blew up and he had to retire. Scheckter soon faded away, giving Hunt second. That was how it ended, with Lauda winning to take a large championship lead, Hunt finishing second and Mass third.

Race 10: Great Britain
The tenth round was held at the Silverstone airfield circuit in Great Britain, and Tom Pryce took a home pole position, with Pace second and championship leader Lauda third. Pace beat Pryce into the first corner, with Regazzoni third ahead of Lauda. After 10 laps, Regazzoni passed Pryce for second, and soon both of them passed Pace. It soon began to rain, and Regazzoni was pulling away until he spun off, hit a barrier and damaged his rear wing. He rejoined two laps down. Pryce now led, but he crashed out as well, two laps later. Scheckter had meanwhile passed both Lauda and Pace, and he was now leading.

Scheckter pitted for wet tyres from the lead, and most drivers followed suit. Hunt (after passing Pace) was the leader from Pace and Emerson Fittipaldi as they had not pitted for dries. Scheckter and Jarier both caught and passed the trio, but the track was drying out, and both had to pit for dries soon after. Hunt began to lose power in his engine, and was passed by Fittipaldi, and then Pace, and even a recovering Scheckter. On lap 56 out of 70, the rain fell again, in a massive shower with the whole field on dries. Nearly all the drivers spun off and crashed, and race was stopped. Only 6 drivers were left (notably Fittipaldi). The race was stopped, and the results were declared on the lap before the storm struck. Fittipaldi was the winner, and Pace and Scheckter, despite crashing out, were given second and third.

The result meant that Fittipaldi closed within 14 points of Lauda with five races left.

Race 11: West Germany
The drivers had to go to West Germany, in the legendary Nordschleife track, for round 11- and this proved to be the most crucial round in the championship (the German Grand Prix often was). Lauda was on pole, lapping the 14.2 mi (22.8 km) circuit in under 7 minutes- becoming the first driver to accomplish this feat. Pace was on the front row, and the two Tyrrell drivers Scheckter and Depailler third and fourth respectively. At the start, Lauda led from Pace, with Depailler getting third from his teammate Scheckter, who made a dreadful start and dropped to 20th. Depailler was past Pace early on, but by midway through the race, both drivers were out of contention, Pace retiring with a puncture, and Depailler having to pit after a suspension failure. Lauda continued to lead with Regazzoni up to second, until the latter's engine failed. Lauda then suffered a puncture and a damaged spoiler and had to pit, leaving Reutemann to lead from Hunt and Pryce. Hunt was next to retire, with a wheel hub failure on the straight behind the pits, and Pryce took second, but only briefly as he had to back off towards the end with fuel-feed troubles. At the front, Reutemann took his first win of the season, with Jacques Laffite's Williams second, and Lauda recovering to third.

Race 12: Austria
The Austrian GP on 17 August had a very large attendance, as Lauda had a chance of getting close to the championship at his home race. Lauda did not disappoint them, as he took pole position, with Hunt second and Fittipaldi third. His chief rival, Reutemann, was only 11th. On a morning practice lap, Mark Donohue's March slid off the track after a tyre failure and hit two marshals. Donohue died two days later, and one of the marshals also died.

It began to rain just before the race started, but it did not deter Lauda, who led from Hunt and Depailler. Depailler soon dropped back, and it was Vittorio Brambilla who was up to third. Lauda also began to struggle as the rain became heavier, and Hunt took the lead and Brambilla second on lap 15. Brambilla went to take the lead from Hunt four laps later when they were lapping a backmarker, whereas Pryce passed Lauda for third. Conditions became so bad that the organizers showed the chequered flag early, with Brambilla the winner (he spun off on the slowing down lap and crashed, and drove around to the pits waving to the fans with a badly damaged car), Hunt second and Pryce completing the podium. Only half points were given, as the race was stopped early, just like in Spain.

Race 13: Italy
The penultimate round was in Italy, and after the cancellation of the Canadian GP, Lauda needed only half a point to be the 1975 world champion. The Ferrari fans were very happy as their team locked out the front row, with Lauda on pole from Regazzoni, and Fittipaldi third. Regazzoni took the lead at the start, with Lauda and Mass following. Soon Reutemann was up to third, but he needed to win to keep any faint hopes alive. However, he was passed by Fittipaldi, and towards the end, Lauda backed off and let Fittipaldi through. It was Regazzoni who won the race, with Fittipaldi second, and Lauda's third was enough to seal the championship.

Race 14: United States
The final round took place in the US, and it was no surprise that at the spectacular Watkins Glen track in upstate New York (which had a new chicane at the Esses introduced), new World Champion Lauda took pole again, with Fittipaldi alongside and Reutemann third. Lauda led into the first corner from Fittipaldi, and it was Jarier in third. Lauda and Fittipaldi drove away from the rest of the field, whereas Jarier retired with a wheel failure one-third into the race. This left Hunt in third, but Mass had other ideas and took the place midway through the race. Lauda went on to win, his fifth of the season, as he signed off in style, with Fittipaldi close behind in second, and Mass also on the podium.

Results and standings

Grands Prix

World Drivers' Championship standings

Points were awarded on a 9–6–4–3–2–1 basis to the first six finishers at each Grand Prix. Only the six best results from the first seven races and the six best results from the last seven races counted towards the World Championship.

  Half points were awarded because the races were stopped before 75% of the scheduled distance was completed.

International Cup for F1 Manufacturers standings
Points were awarded on a 9-6-4-3-2-1 basis to the first six finishers at each Grand Prix, but only one car per constructor could score points at each Grand Prix. Only the six best results from the first seven races and the six best results from the last seven races counted towards the International Cup for F1 Manufacturers.

 Bold results counted to championship.
  Half points awarded because the races were stopped before 75% of the scheduled distance was completed.

Non-championship races
Other Formula One races were also held in 1975, which did not count towards the World Championship.

South African Formula One Championship

Notes

References 

Formula One seasons